These are the results for the Australian Senate at the 2019 Australian federal election.

Australia

New South Wales

Victoria

Queensland

Western Australia

South Australia

Tasmania

Territories

Australian Capital Territory

Northern Territory

Notes

References

2019 Australian federal election
Senate 2019
Australian Senate elections